The Lenovo ThinkPad X100e is a laptop from the ThinkPad line that was manufactured by Lenovo.

References

External links 
 Arch Linux Wiki - X100e
 Thinkwiki.de - X100e

ThinkPad
Lenovo laptops